Take Me Home Tonight may refer to:

 "Take Me Home Tonight" (song), a 1986 song by Eddie Money, featuring Ronnie Spector
 Take Me Home Tonight (film), a 2011 American film, starring Topher Grace

See also 
 "Fake Me Home Tonight", an episode of Glory Daze